Dmitry Evstratievich Kharitonov (1896-1970), also spelt Charitonov, was the first native Russian arachnologist. In 1916 he founded the arachnological school of Perm State University, the oldest arachnology research group in Russia. The culmination of his work was the comprehensive Katalog der russischen Spinnen (en: Catalogue of Russian spiders), published bilingually in 1932, with an addition published in 1936. He grew up under the supervision of Dmitry Mikhailovich Fedotov, an arachnologist from St. Petersburg. One of his postgraduates, T.S. Mkheidze, has been working in Georgia since the 1930s.

References

Soviet arachnologists
Scientists from the Russian Empire
Perm State University alumni
1896 births
1970 deaths

{